William Felix Knight (stage name: Felix Knight, November 1, 1908 – June 18, 1998), was an American tenor, actor, and vocal teacher, best known for his role as Tom-Tom in the 1934 Laurel and Hardy holiday musical film Babes in Toyland.

Early life 
William Felix Knight was born in Macon, Georgia, the son of a cotton farmer who died in a hunting accident when Knight was five. Seven years later, he moved with his family to Pensacola, Florida, where he began to play the guitar. By his mid-teens, Knight was singing at dances and nightspots. By 1925, he was featured on a local radio station, and a movie company manager on location at the time to make a feature film urged Knight to travel to and try his luck in California.

Beginning of fame (1929–1934) 
Knight found a vocal teacher in California, but was unable to earn a movie contract. To compensate, Knight did local singing jobs and church work, eventually gaining financial support from the Harkness Scholarship Foundation to aid in paying for his vocal lessons. By 1929, Knight was singing in a Santa Barbara, California Columbia network (later CBS) station, and additionally, had a national show, WCC Presents Felix Knight. Knight entered the Arwater Kent Foundation Scholarship Auditions of the Air, and made it to Manhattan prior to placing second in the judging.

Upon returning to California, Knight sang at the Hollywood Bowl in the Giuseppe Verdi opera La traviata alongside Lily Pons, and then traveled to San Francisco, California, where he did Hector Berlioz's La damnation de Faust with the city's opera company. Once he returned to Hollywood, he continued voice studying and radio work, including the CBS program Shell Mountain House with Raymond Paige and his Orchestra. Knight finally made his screen debut in 1934 in RKO Pictures Down to Their Last Yacht as a South Seas native who sings "Malakamokolu." Following this was the role of a gypsy in the Charles Boyer—Loretta Young picture Caravan, starring Boyer.

Peak of fame (1934–1937) 

Knight's biggest and best-known role was as the love interest of Little Bo Peep, Tom-Tom, the Piper's Son, in the 1934 Laurel and Hardy musical film Babes in Toyland, based on the famed 1903 operetta by Victor Herbert. Not only did Knight play the romantic lead, but he also performed several musical numbers, including "A Castle in Spain." Despite being placed under a contract with MGM, Knight did no films directly for the studio. Rather, he was loaned out for other assignments, such as attending Warner Bros. for two musical shorts: Springtime in Holland (1935) and Carnival Day (1936). In the former, he was cast as a Dutch milk seller, and sang the numbers "The Girl on the Little Blue Plate" and "Beside the Zuider Zee". In Carnival Day, he played a jockey who romances a flower girl (Joan Barclay), and sang the numbers "The Rose in Her Hair" and "Steppin' Along." MGM released his next feature, The Bohemian Girl, but similar to Babes in Toyland, it was made by producer Hal Roach independently, and reunited Laurel and Hardy with Knight; the feature also gave Knight a small role—a gypsy singer who performs a number from the Michael William Balfe—Alfred Bunn opera of 1843. A test Knight had done for Roach ended up in Pick a Star, an MGM musical comedy film that also featured Laurel and Hardy in a non-speaking guest bit; Knight was briefly seen as a nightclub singer. Even though he studied acting with Irving Pichel, no further film opportunities came to Knight, other than a potential film series in Australia that in time, failed to materialize.

Life in New York and later life (1937–1960s) 
Knight moved to New York City in 1937. There, he made radio recordings for Thesaurus Transcriptions with Nathaniel Shilkret and his Orchestra, and a year later, he recorded nine songs for Victor Records with Leo Reisman's orchestra. He also started to perform on network radio again, first with the Schaefer All-Star Parade on NBC, which ran from 1938 to 1940, as well as the NBC Blue Network's Music Appreciation Hour in 1938, and the RCA Magic Key [The Magic Key] during the 1938–39 season. Knight also had a weekly program on the radio station WEAF (later known as WNBC (AM)) every Thursday. In 1938, he was one of the finalists on NBC's Metropolitan Opera Auditions of the Air, losing to John Carter by a single vote. In 1939, he made his concert recital debut at The Town Hall, singing selections from Johannes Brahms, Francesco Cavalli, Alessandro Stradella, and Richard Strauss. Knight made his Broadway debut in October 1940 as the featured singer in It Happens on Ice, and in 1942, he sang the role of Camile de Jolidon in Franz Lehár's The Merry Widow at Carnegie Hall. In his final Broadway role, he played Almaviva in Once Over Lightly in 1942 with Igor Gorin and Grace Panvini; the production was based on Gioachino Rossini's The Barber of Seville.

In 1940, Knight again recorded for Victor Records, and continued to be heard on radio in musical programs such as The Ford Sunday Evening Hour, and Music Hall of the Air (Radio City Music Hall), and the game program So You Think You Know Music. Knight also served in World War II, and was present at Guadalcanal.

1946 was an eventful and prosperous year for Knight. Not only did he continue to be very active in radio, but he also signed with Decca Records and became a member of the Metropolitan Opera. While at Decca, he recorded operettas and popular songs, and was a vocalist with the Guy Lombardo and Russ Morgan orchestras. For his debut at the Met, Knight sang the role of Count Almaviva in Il barbiere di Siviglia, the same role he did in the English-language version of the opera Once Over Lightly four years prior. He remained at the Met until 1950, but also continued to appear on radio in series including The Pet Milk Show and The American Album of Familiar Music.

Knight had his own television series, Felix Knight Sings, in the early 1950s, airing every Tuesday and Thursday afternoon. His other television work included appearances on NBC Television Concert Hall in 1948, singing Rodolfo's aria from La bohème on Your Show of Shows in April 1950, and performing Christmas hymns on a holiday edition of Juvenile Jury in December 1951. During this time, Knight also created more records for RCA Victor including the tenor roles in excerpts from Victor Herbert operettas with soprano Doretta Morrow.

After leaving the Met, Knight appeared for two months at the Capitol Theatre, then spent the next several years giving concerts (appearing with the Philadelphia Orchestra and the Detroit Symphony Orchestra, among others), performing in summer stock, and working supper- and nightclubs. In 1960, he and Mimi Benzell did an album from the musicals Can-Can and Kiss Me, Kate for Design Records. On television, Knight was an occasional guest on late-night talk programs such as The Jack Paar Show in September 1961.

Toward the end of the 1960s, Knight had grown fatigued of constant traveling and launched yet another music career, this time, as a vocal teacher. His students included both Broadway and opera singers, and he continued to teach for the remainder of his life. Knight was a member of the Founding Tent of the Sons of the Desert, the Laurel and Hardy international society, and he attended several of their conventions.

Personal life

Marriage and children 

While on the set of Babes in Toyland, Knight fell in love with fellow co-star Alice Moore, who played the Queen of Hearts. They eloped to Yuma, Arizona and married there on October 17, 1935. They divorced on March 14, 1939.

In 1940, Knight married Ethel Blume, a radio actress who appeared on The Adventures of Helen, The Aldrich Family, Easy Aces, John's Other Wife, and Joyce Jordan, M.D. The two had one child, William Felix Knight II, who at one point would star in an episode of Juvenile Jury in 1954.

Death 
Knight died on June 18, 1998, at Calvary Hospital in the Bronx, New York City. He is buried in the Woodlawn Cemetery in the Bronx. Not long before his death, Knight told writer Laura Wagner (Classic Images, June 1998): "I did my best, I tried to be a nice guy. I helped people whenever I could, and I never complained. ... For a country boy from a cotton patch in Macon, Georgia—I think I did pretty good."

His wife, Ethel Blume, died in Brookline, Massachusetts on January 16, 2014, two days after her 95th birthday.

Filmography

Film

Television

Stage

Radio

Soundtrack

References

External links 
 

1998 deaths
American tenors
American male film actors
1908 births
American male musical theatre actors
20th-century American singers
20th-century American male actors
Actors from Macon, Georgia
Singers from Georgia (U.S. state)
Male actors from Georgia (U.S. state)
Musicians from Pensacola, Florida
Male actors from Florida
Singers from Florida
20th-century American male singers
Burials at Woodlawn Cemetery (Bronx, New York)